Günter Petersmann (born 21 April 1941) is a German rower. He competed in the men's eight event at the 1972 Summer Olympics.

References

1941 births
Living people
German male rowers
Olympic rowers of West Germany
Rowers at the 1972 Summer Olympics
Sportspeople from Dortmund